Strickland Nunatak is a large nunatak between Savage Nunatak and Spear Nunatak at the head of Reedy Glacier. Mapped by United States Geological Survey (USGS) from surveys and U.S. Navy air photos, 1960–64. Named by Advisory Committee on Antarctic Names (US-ACAN) for Emest E. Strickland, utilitiesman at Byrd Station in 1962.

Nunataks of Marie Byrd Land